Nándor Mikola (born Nándor Josef Mikolajcsik, ; 27 November 1911 – 3 May 2006) was a watercolor painter from Vaasa, Finland, but born in Budapest, Hungary.

Following in the footsteps of his father Ignác Mikolajcik, Mikola started studying lithography at the Budapest University for Art and Design in 1928. He graduated as a lithographer in 1932 and participated for the first time in a public exhibition at the Obuda district culture house in Budapest, where he displayed his watercolour paintings. That year he worked as a lithographer in Budapest but continued studies at Graphic Institute of Vienna, Austria, the same year. In 1935 Mikola arrived in Helsinki, Finland to help his Hungarian artist friend Josef Miklos to decorate a restaurant called "Hungaria".

Mikola, who rather painted with his heart than his mind, found most of his inspiration in the colors and forms of nature, in the rhythm of the landscape and in light and shade. His works can be seen as representations of personal experiences. The mood is always in focus.

20th-century Finnish painters
21st-century Finnish painters
Lithographers
Artists from Budapest
Hungarian emigrants to Finland
1911 births
2006 deaths
20th-century Hungarian painters
20th-century lithographers